Vitovnica is a village situated in Petrovac na Mlavi municipality in Serbia. This village was the birthplace of the important Serbian spiritual writer, Elder Thaddeus who was born in 1914 as Tomislav Štrbulović. The  village is also home to the Vitovnica Monastery of the Serbian Orthodox Church. Elder Thaddeus was a hegumen at the Vitovnica Monastery from April 14, 1962 until the end of March in 1972. His gravesite is at the monastery.

References

Populated places in Braničevo District